The Chocolate Girl (French: La petite chocolatière) is a 1932 French comedy film directed by Marc Allégret and starring Raimu, Jacqueline Francell and Pierre Bertin. It is an adaptation of Paul Gavault's play The Chocolate Girl.

The film's sets were designed by the art director Gabriel Scognamillo.

Cast
 Raimu as Félicien Bédarride 
 Jacqueline Francell as Benjamine Lapistolle 
 Pierre Bertin as Paul Normand 
 Jean Gobet as Hector 
 André Dubosc as M. Lapistolle 
 Michèle Verly as Rosette 
 Simone Simon as Julie 
 Anthony Gildès as Mingassol

References

External links
 

1932 films
French comedy films
1932 comedy films
1930s French-language films
Films directed by Marc Allégret
French films based on plays
French black-and-white films
Remakes of French films
Sound film remakes of silent films
1930s French films